Strzemię (Polish for "Stirrup") is a Polish coat of arms. It was used by several szlachta families under the Polish–Lithuanian Commonwealth.

History

Blazon
Gules, a stirrup Or.

Notable bearers
Notable bearers of this Coat of Arms have included:
 Antoni Józef Madaliński (1739–1804) – Polish general

External links

See also
 Polish heraldry
 Heraldry
 Coat of Arms

Polish coats of arms